Carlos Eduardo Rodríguez may refer to:

 Carlos Rodríguez (fencer) (born 1978), Venezuelan fencer
 Carlos Eduardo Rodríguez (footballer) (born 2000), Venezuelan footballer